Old Man Luedecke is the recording name of two-time Juno Award-winning Canadian singer-songwriter and banjo player Christopher “Chris” Rudolf Luedecke of Chester, Nova Scotia. He is most noted as a two-time Juno Award winner for Roots & Traditional Album of the Year – Solo, winning at the Juno Awards of 2009 for Proof of Love and at the Juno Awards of 2011 for My Hands are on Fire and Other Love Songs.

In 2012 Tender is the Night was released and picked up a Juno nomination as well as "Folk Album of the Year" from Music Nova Scotia.

Luedecke has also toured as a member of The Pan-Canadian New Folk Ensemble with Kim Barlow and Christine Fellows.

In 2019 he recorded an album, Easy Money, at Montreal's hotel2tango studio with local folk musicians Howard Bilerman, Afie Jurvanen, Fats Kaplin and Tim O'Brien.

Discography 
Mole in the Ground (2003, out of print)
Hinterland (2006, Black Hen Music)
Proof of Love (2008, Black Hen Music)
My Hands Are on Fire and Other Love Songs (2010, Black Hen Music)
Tender Is the Night (2012, True North Records)
I Never Sang Before I Met You (2014, True North Records)
Domestic Eccentric (2015, True North Records)
Easy Money (2019, True North Records)

References

External links
Old Man Luedecke

Canadian indie rock musicians
Canadian alternative country singers
Musicians from Nova Scotia
Canadian folk singer-songwriters
Canadian male singer-songwriters
Canadian banjoists
Juno Award for Roots & Traditional Album of the Year – Solo winners
Black Hen Music artists
True North Records artists